Jason Donald  may refer to:

Jason Donald (baseball) (born 1984), American baseball infielder
Jason Donald (cyclist) (born 1980), American bicycle racer